The bean leafskeletonizer (Autoplusia egena) is a moth of the family Noctuidae. It is found in California, North Carolina to the South-eastern parts of the United States, the Antilles, Mexico, Central America and South America. The subspecies Autoplusia egena galapagensis is endemic to the Galapagos islands.

The larvae feed on Amaryllidaceae, Apiaceae, Asteraceae, Boraginaceae, Brassicaceae, Fabaceae, Lamiaceae, Malvaceae, Ranunculaceae, Glycine max and Phaseolus vulgaris.

Subspecies
Autoplusia egena egena
Autoplusia egena galapagensis

Plusiinae